Board of Trade Building can refer to:

Canada
 Board of Trade Building (Victoria, British Columbia)
 Toronto Board of Trade Building, Toronto, Ontario

United States
 Los Angeles Board of Trade Building, Los Angeles, California
 Chicago Board of Trade Building, Chicago, Illinois
 Haverhill Board of Trade Building, Haverhill, Massachusetts
Board of Trade Building (Duluth, Minnesota), one of Duluth's tallest buildings
Minnesota Block-Board of Trade Bldg., Superior, Wisconsin, listed on the National Register of Historic Places in Wisconsin